or  is a Shingon Buddhist temple in Kurume, Fukuoka Prefecture, Japan. It is a direct branch of Narita-san Shinshō-ji in Narita, Chiba Prefecture.

Founding
The temple was established in 1958 after part of the spiritual embodiment from the Narita-san Shinshō-ji Temple which is well-known throughout Japan for housing Fudō myōō (Ācala) was given to it.

Jibo Kannon
The Jibo Kannon of the Jeweled Gates of Good Fortune is the fourth tallest statue in Japan, and the twenty-fourth tallest in the world. The temple was spending ¥2 billion (approximately $50 million) to build a large statue of Kannon and the work was completed in 1982. 

The dot on her forehead is a gold plate 30 centimetres in diameter encrusted with 18 three-carat diamonds, and her ornamental necklace contains an arrangement of a crystal and 56 jade stones.

Visitors take a spiral staircase to the platform providing a panoramic view of the area, as far as Mount Unzen in the distance.

The Hell and Paradise Museum
The Hell and Paradise Museum, a replica of Mahabodhi Temple in Bodh Gaya, India, is built on the temple grounds. It features dramatic, graphic recreations of scenes showing Buddhist heaven and hell.

Access
From Nishitetsu Kurume Station, board a bus towards Yame Eigyōshō. Get off the bus at "Kamitsu Machi," approximately 15 minutes from the train station.

Gallery

See also
List of tallest statues
Narita-san Shinshō-ji

References

External links
 
Daihonzan Naritasan Kurume Temple - Kurume Bureau of Tourism and International Exchange 

Buddhist temples in Fukuoka Prefecture
Shingon Buddhism
Colossal Guanyin statues
1982 sculptures
1958 establishments in Japan
Statues in Japan
Buildings and structures in Fukuoka Prefecture
Kurume
20th-century establishments in Japan